61st Street is an American legal drama television series created by Peter Moffat that premiered on AMC on April 10, 2022. A second and final season was produced; however, in January 2023, AMC decided against airing it.

Premise
Moses Johnson, a promising, black high school athlete, is swept up into the infamously corrupt Chicago criminal justice system. Taken by the police as a supposed gang member, Johnson finds himself and his lawyer Franklin Roberts in the eye of the storm as police and prosecutors seek revenge for the death of an officer during a drug bust gone wrong.

Cast and characters

Main
 Courtney B. Vance as Franklin Roberts
 Tosin Cole as Moses Johnson
 Bentley Green as Joshua Johnson
 Holt McCallany as Lt. Brannigan
 Aunjanue Ellis as Martha Roberts
 Andrene Ward-Hammond as Norma Johnson
 Mark O'Brien as Officer Logan

Recurring
 Patrick Mulvey as Michael Rossi
 Rebecca Spence as Jessica Rossi
 Jarell Maximillian Sullivan as David Roberts
 Matthew Elam as TJ
 Ben Barten as James Frater
 Kamal Angelo Bolden as Young
 Emily Althaus as Nicole Carter
 Julian Parker as Dante Blake
 Jerod Haynes as Big Phil
 Malkia Stampley as Marisol
 Rashada Dawan as Janet Porter
 Madison Dirks as Marty Gallagher
 Morocco Omari as Speak
 Sammy A. Publes as Coach Angelo
 Michael Patrick Thornton as Michael Patrick Thornton
 Jayson Lee as Calvin Harris
 Al'Jaleel McGhee as Lotty
 Antonie Pierre as Deputy Moss

Episodes

Production

Development
In February 2019, AMC began development on 61st Street which was created by Peter Moffat who is executive producing alongside Michael B. Jordan and Alana Mayo. In October 2019, AMC greenlighted the series and gave it a two-season order, with each season consisting of eight episodes. Series star Courtney B. Vance serves as an executive producer.

Casting
In January 2020, Courtney B. Vance, Tosin Cole and Bentley Green were cast in the series. In May 2020, Eric Lange was cast in the series. In February 2021, Holt McCallany replaced Lange; and Aunjanue Ellis, Killian Scott, and Andrene Ward-Hammond were cast in the series. In March 2021, Jerod Haynes was cast in the series. In May 2021, Mark O'Brien replaced Killian Scott as Officer Logan in the series.

Release
The series was originally set to premiere in 2021. The premiere was delayed and it premiered on April 10, 2022. The second season of the series had already been filmed, but there are no longer plans by AMC to air it, as part of cost-cutting measures announced in December 2022.

Reception
The review aggregator website Rotten Tomatoes reported a 69% approval rating with an average rating of 6.2/10, based on 16 critic reviews. The website's critics consensus reads, "61st Street is situated smack dab in a clichéd zip code of television drama, but terrific performances by Courtney B. Vance and a strong supporting cast provide some local attraction." Metacritic, which uses a weighted average, assigned a score of 66 out of 100 based on 11 critics, indicating "generally favorable reviews".

References

External links

2022 American television series debuts
2022 American television series endings
2020s American drama television series
2020s American legal television series
Television shows set in Chicago
English-language television shows
AMC (TV channel) original programming
Television series by BBC Studios